The second series of the ITV1 television series Benidorm, which is a sitcom set in an all-inclusive holiday resort (The Solana) in Benidorm, Spain, began broadcasting on 28 March 2008, consisting of eight episodes. The entire series was directed by Sandy Johnson and written by Derren Litten. Returning from the first series were the Garvey family, consisting of Mick (Steve Pemberton), Janice (Siobhan Finneran), Chantelle (Hannah Hobley), Michael (Oliver Stokes) and Janice's mother Madge Barron (Sheila Reid), whereas Geoffrey Hutchings was introduced as Mel Harvey, Madge's new fiancé; swingers Donald (Kenny Ireland) and Jacqueline Stewart (Janine Duvitski); mother and son Noreen (Elsie Kelly) and Geoff "The Oracle" Maltby (Johnny Vegas); homosexual couple Gavin (Hugh Sachs) and Troy Ramsbottom (Paul Bazely); un-keen couple Kate (Abigail Cruttenden) and Martin Weedon (Nicholas Burns); and Solana staff Mateo Castellanos (Jake Canuso) and manageress Janey York (Crissy Rock).

Overall, the series received an average viewership of 5.98 million, with the opening episode receiving 7.14 million viewers. The series concluded on 16 May 2008, with the series finale attracting 6.32 million viewers. As a result of the second series' finale being left on a cliff hanger, a special was broadcast over a year later – on 31 May 2009, which was produced in order to conclude the second series before the third series was broadcast in late 2009.

Cast 
 Abigail Cruttenden as Kate Weedon
 Nicholas Burns as Martin Weedon
 Elsie Kelly as Noreen Maltby
 Johnny Vegas as Geoff Maltby
 Steve Pemberton as Mick Garvey
 Siobhan Finneran as Janice Garvey
 Sheila Reid as Madge Harvey
 Geoffrey Hutchings as Mel Harvey
 Oliver Stokes as Michael Garvey
 Hannah Hobley as Chantelle Garvey
 Kenny Ireland as Donald Stewart
 Janine Duvitski as Jacqueline Stewart 
 Hugh Sachs as Gavin Ramsbottom
 Paul Bazely as Troy Ramsbottom
 Jake Canuso as Mateo Castellanos
 Crissy Rock as Janey York

Episodes

Ratings

References

External links 
 

Benidorm (TV series)
2008 British television seasons